Count Basie Jam Session at the Montreux Jazz Festival 1975, also referred to as Basie Jam, is a live album by pianist/bandleader Count Basie recorded in 1976 and released by the Pablo label.

Reception

The AllMusic review stated "This truly all-star session finds Basie stepping outside the traditional big band context to stretch out with a few close friends ... finger-popping grooves".

Track listing
 "Billie's Bounce" (Charlie Parker) – 11:45
 "Festival Blues" (Count Basie, Milt Jackson, Johnny Griffin, Roy Eldridge, Niels Pedersen, Louie Bellson) – 10:53
 "Lester Leaps In" (Lester Young) – 16:06

Personnel 
Count Basie – piano
Roy Eldridge – trumpet
Johnny Griffin – tenor saxophone
Milt Jackson – vibraphone
Niels Pedersen – bass
Louis Bellson – drums

References 

1975 live albums
Count Basie live albums
Pablo Records live albums
Albums produced by Norman Granz
Albums recorded at the Montreux Jazz Festival